Black Brook is a tributary of the Whippany River that flows near Morristown Regional Airport in Morristown, Morris County, New Jersey, in the United States.

See also
List of rivers of New Jersey

References

Rivers of Morris County, New Jersey
Tributaries of the Passaic River
Rivers of New Jersey